Holling is a surname. Notable people with the surname include:

 Carl Holling (1896–1962), American baseball player
 C. S. Holling (1930 - 2019), Canadian ecologist
 Holling C. Holling (1900–1973), American illustrator
 Thomas L. Holling (1889–1966), American politician

See also
 Hollings